Mitoyo may refer to:
 Mitoyo, Kagawa, a city in Kagawa Prefecture, Japan
 Mitoyo District, Kagawa, a former district in Kagawa Prefecture
 Mitoyo Kawate (1889–2003), Japanese supercentenarian